Efraín Amador Piñero (born 1947) is a Cuban guitarist, lutist, composer and professor. He has conducted extensive investigations about the “Cuban lute” and “tres” performance styles, and has created several methods of study and numerous compositions for those instruments.

Studies

Amador began studying guitar at Havana Municipal Conservatory (Amadeo Roldán) with renowned professor Isaac Nicola and graduated in 1970. At a later time he studied guitar at the Instituto Superior de Arte with professors Nicola and Leo Brouwer, as well as musical composition with José Ardévol, Roberto Valera and José Loyola. In 1981 he received a Doctorate Degree from the Instituto Superior de Arte. He also received post-graduate instruction from distinguished guitarist such as Alirio Díaz and Antonio Lauro.

Work

Efraín Amador is credited for having achieved the inclusion of the Cuban “lute” and “tres” performance techniques in the academic programs of art schools in Cuba. He has closely collaborated with his wife Doris Oropesa in numerous performances   and has served for many years as a professor at the Instituto Superior de Arte (ISA).

During the year 2012, Efraín Amador visited the United States, where he was invited to participate at the Grand Ole Opry in Nashville, Tennessee. In San Francisco he was received by renowned guitarist David Tanenbaum, who hosted Amador's two hours lecture concert, where he exposed the characteristics and principles of the “Cuban School of tres and laud”. At the same city, Amador participated in a TV and radio broadcast, and ended his tour in Oregon, where he played at the Oswego County and at the Hispanic Art and Culture Festival in Portland. During that trip, Efraín Amador also recorded a CD at a Studio in Los Angeles, California.

Musical compositions

Amador's ample catalog of compositions include:

Choir 
  
 Oye pionerito, coro infantil
 Pobre niño siboney, coro infantil
 En un rincón de Viet Nam, coro infantil, 1968
 Canción del siglo, coro mixto
 He recorrido, coro infantil; 1969
 Un río es un niño, 1973, coro infantil
 
Choir and orchestra
 
 Tríptico, 1978
 
Guitar 
 
 Cuatro comentarios sobre Leo Brouwer, 1970
 Suite para un cacique, 1972
 Invención núms. 1-5
 Contrapuntos cubanos y Guajira, 1975
 Estudio para la mano izquierda, 1976
 Dos estudios con el dedo quinto y Preludio con tumbao, 1976
 Differencias sobre tres temas cubanos, 1977
 Fantasía del son, Fantasía y Son de la mano diestra, 1981
 Preludio espirituano núms. I y II, 1987
 Estudio en Mi menor, 1988
 
Guitar and piano
 
 Canto latinoamericano

Lute

 Escuela del laúd campesino, 1983-1986
 Son para un amigo, 1985
 Cuatro preludios, 1995-1996
 Concierto, para laúd y orquesta de guitarra, 1988-1989

Lute and piano
 
 Fantasía guajira, laúd, guitarra y piano, 1983-1984
 Suite campesina núm. 1, 1984-1985
 De lo real maravilloso (Homenaje a José Manuel Rodríguez), 1986-1987

Tres
 
 Escuela del tres cubano, 1986
 Regreso a mi tres, 1986
 Rondó campesino, 1986
 Primavera en Estocolmo, 1991
 Variaciones sobre aires sureños, 1992
 Estudio en estilo barroco, 1998

Tres and piano
 
 Guanabaquiste, 1986
 Variaciones para amanecer, 1998
 Tres and orchestra
 Concierto, tres y orquesta sinfónica, 1987-1988
 Concierto para amanecer, orquesta de guitarra, 1991
 Violin and  piano
 Sonata amanecer, 1986
 Voice and guitar
 Al final del año de la alegría, Traza prodigios
 Tarde es para el árbol
 Tal vez una canción de amor
 Y las palabras, textos: Alex Fleites, 1979-1980
 Celia, 1980, texto: Efraín Amador
 Poema para dos, texto: Alex Fleites
 Días de Etiopía, texto: Nelson Herrera Ysla, 1981

Voice and piano
 
 Para la palma una nave, 1976

See also

Music of Cuba

References

External links
 YouTube. Fernando Murga and Efraín Amador con sus alumnos en el ISA, Habana. https://www.youtube.com/watch?v=Dixz1BMHTTE
 YouTube. Escuela cubana del tres y el laúd, Fernando Murga "Murguita", Efraín Amador. https://www.youtube.com/watch?v=DiC-KQ2KIQc
YouTube. Efraín Amador. https://www.youtube.com/watch?v=1H9r4wUR0_Y

Cuban composers
Male composers
Living people
1947 births
Cuban guitarists
Cuban male guitarists
Cuban classical guitarists
Instituto Superior de Arte alumni
Academic staff of the Instituto Superior de Arte
Cuban male musicians